The Penrose triangle, also known as the Penrose tribar,  the impossible tribar, or the impossible triangle, is a triangular impossible object, an optical illusion consisting of an object which can be depicted in a perspective drawing, but cannot exist as a solid object. It was first created by the Swedish artist Oscar Reutersvärd in 1934. Independently from Reutersvärd, the triangle was devised and popularized in the 1950s by psychiatrist Lionel Penrose and his son, prominent Nobel Prize-winning mathematician Sir Roger Penrose, who described it as "impossibility in its purest form". It is featured prominently in the works of artist M. C. Escher, whose earlier depictions of impossible objects partly inspired it.

Description

The tribar/triangle appears to be a solid object, made of three straight beams of square cross-section which meet pairwise at right angles at the vertices of the triangle they form. The beams may be broken, forming cubes or cuboids.

This combination of properties cannot be realized by any three-dimensional object in ordinary Euclidean space.  Such an object can exist in certain Euclidean 3-manifolds.  There also exist three-dimensional solid shapes each of which, when viewed from a certain angle, appears the same as the 2-dimensional depiction of the Penrose triangle on this page (such as – for example – the adjacent image depicting a sculpture in Perth, Australia).  The term "Penrose Triangle" can refer to the 2-dimensional depiction or the impossible object itself.

If a line is traced around the Penrose triangle, a 4-loop Möbius strip is formed.

Depictions

M.C. Escher's lithograph Waterfall (1961) depicts a watercourse that flows in a zigzag along the long sides of two elongated Penrose triangles, so that it ends up two stories higher than it began. The resulting waterfall, forming the short sides of both triangles, drives a water wheel. Escher points out that in order to keep the wheel turning, some water must occasionally be added to compensate for evaporation.

Sculptures

See also
Impossible trident
Shepard elephant
Three hares
Penrose steps
Mobius strip

References

External links
 An article about impossible triangle sculpture in Perth
 Escher for Real constructions

Topology
Impossible objects
Triangles
1934 introductions